"Song for Guy" is a mainly instrumental piece of music by English musician Elton John. It is the closing track of his 1978 album, A Single Man.

Musical structure

The song opens with an octaved solo piano, which is then accompanied by a looped Roland CR-78 drum machine, with occasional shaker and wind chimes alternating; other keyboards are often layered in shortly after, with a bass guitar mainly accompanying this. It is instrumental until the end, in which the words "Life – isn't everything (3x)" are repeated over the primary melody.

It stands as one of the few songs written by Elton John alone and the only instrumental piece of music made by himself to be released as a lead single. After this song, his other instrumental songs were only released as B-sides notably "Choc Ice Goes Mental" (A-sides: "I Guess That's Why They Call It the Blues" & "Kiss the Bride") and "The Man Who Never Died" (A-sides: "Nikita" & "The Last Song").

Reception
Cash Box said it has "an alluring beauty," with "spunky piano chording, rhythm ace backing, evocative synthesizer explorations and chimes." Record World said it would surprise his fans as "an instrumental with traditional orchestral arrangements and John's own semi-classical piano work."

Release and performances
The song was one of his most successful singles in the UK, peaking at No. 4 in January 1979, and remaining on the chart for ten weeks, returning him to the Top Ten since 1976's "Don't Go Breaking My Heart", where it reached at No. 1 at the same chart. It wasn't released in the US until March 1979 where it barely made the charts, peaking at No. 110. It was a modest success, though, on the American adult contemporary charts, where it peaked at No. 37 in the spring of 1979.

John continued to perform this song in various locations. In 1992, Elton played it together with "Your Song" to close some concerts.

Use in media
The song was used extensively throughout all 6 episodes of the 1985 BBC comedy series Happy Families (the lead male character is named Guy). It is also used in the seventh episode of Diamonds in the Sky (1979), a BBC–Channel 9 Perth co-production about the history of commercial aviation, and is played frequently in the 1980 movie Oh Heavenly Dog starring Chevy Chase and Jane Seymour and directed by Rod Browning. The song also features prominently in the 2017 film Film Stars Don't Die in Liverpool. In November 2020, the track was featured in The Crown, during a scene in which Lady Diana Spencer dances alone in a Buckingham Palace ballroom.

Personnel
Elton John – piano, Mellotron, Polymoog, ARP String Ensemble, vocals
Ray Cooper – wind chimes, shakers
Clive Franks – bass

Charts

Weekly charts

Year-end charts

References

1978 singles
1979 singles
Elton John songs
Songs with music by Elton John
Music videos directed by Bruce Gowers
Rock instrumentals
1978 songs
The Rocket Record Company singles
MCA Records singles
Easy listening songs